Interior Hearts is a studio album by the punk rock band Legal Weapon. It was independently released in 1985 by Arsenal Records.

Critical reception
Interior Hearts earned mixed to positive reviews. The Los Angeles Times wrote that the band's "sound still packs a punch ... The hard-rock style shows off [Kat] Arthur’s vocal talents in a powerful, uncompromising package." Trouser Press called it "a likable but disappointing LP, with thin sound and more of a country/blues flavor."

Track listing
All songs written by Legal Weapon.

Personnel
Legal Weapon
Kat Arthur – vocals
Brian Hansen – guitar, vocals
Adam Maples – drums, vocals
Eddie Dwayne – bass guitar, vocals

Additional musicians and production
Legal Weapon – production, engineering
Jimmy Zee – harmonica on "Ain't That a Lot of Love" and "Damaged Memories"

References

1985 albums
Legal Weapon albums
Triple X Records albums